Joseph Delaunay (24 December 1752, Angers – 5 April 1794, Paris) was a French deputy.

He was national commissar at the Tribunal of Angers and, in 1791, he was elected as a deputy to the Legislative Assembly by the département of Maine-et-Loire. In 1792, he was re-elected as deputy to the National Convention by the same département.  He was tried for corruption in the affair of the liquidation of the Compagnie des Indes Orientales, condemned to death and guillotined on 16 germinal year II (5 April 1794).

Sources 
 Histoire de la Révolution française by Jules Michelet

External links 
  Delaunay, On the reinforcement of the rôle of Paris's Comité de surveillance - Tuesday 2 October 1792

1752 births
1794 deaths
Deputies to the French National Convention
People from Angers
French people executed by guillotine during the French Revolution